Roy Emerson and Fred Stolle were the defending champions but only Roy Emerson did compete this year.

John Newcombe and Tony Roche won the final 3–6, 6–3, 7–5, 6–8, 8–6 against William Bowrey and Owen Davidson

Seeds 
Champion seeds are indicated in bold text while text in italics indicates the round in which those seeds were eliminated. The top two seeded teams received byes into the second round.

Draw

Final

Top half

Bottom half

References 
 1967 Australian Open Men's Doubles Draw 

1967 in Australian tennis
Men's Doubles